Elizabeth Joan Cosnett (born 17 May 1936) is a British hymnodist.

Life

Elizabeth Joan Cosnett was born on 17 May 1936 in Liverpool, England. She was educated at St Hugh's College, Oxford and went on to become an English lecturer at the Liverpool Institute of Higher Education, retiring in 1996. Her hymns came to attention between the age of 49 and 52, rather later then the average hymnodist, when her collaborations with Ian Sharp won the 1985 and 1988 Songs of Praise competitions organised by the BBC. From 1999 to 2002 (in her retirement) she was the Executive President of the Hymn Society of Great Britain and Ireland.

Output

Hymns written by Elizabeth Joan Cosnett include:
 Can we by searching find out God
 Shaping spirit, move among us
 We bring our children, Lord, today
 What have we to show our Saviour
 When candles are lighted on Candlemas Day

References

1936 births
Alumni of St Hugh's College, Oxford
Christian hymnwriters
Living people
British women hymnwriters